{{quote|
Long as in Freedom's Cause the wise contend,
Dear to your unity shall Fame extend;
While to the World, the letter's Stone shall tell,
How Caldwell, Attucks, Gray and Mav'rick fell.
"On the Affray in King Street, on the Evening of the 5th of March, 1770, about the Boston Massacre | Phillis Wheatley}}

Nationality words link to articles with information on the nation's poetry or literature (for instance, Irish or France).

Works published

Colonial America
 William Billings, The New England Psalm-Singer William Livingsotn:
 "A Soliloquy"
 "America: or, A Poem on the Settlement of the British Colonies"
 John Trumbull, "An Essay on the Uses and Advantages of the Fine Arts"
 Phillis Wheatley:
 "On the Affray in King Street, on the Evening of the 5th of March, 1770" about the Boston Massacre which had taken place near Wheatley's home
 an elegy to George Whitefield that received widespread acclaim. It was published within weeks of his death as a broadside in Boston, then in Newport, Rhode Island, then four more times in Boston and a dozen more times in New York, Philadelphia and Newport. It was published in London in 1771.

United Kingdom

 John Armstrong, Miscellanies, poetry and prose by a physician writer
 Michael Bruce, Poems on Several Occasions Sir David Dalrymple, Lord Hailes, editor, Ancient Scottish Poems, an anthology
 Oliver Goldsmith, The Deserted Village, published in May
 Thomas Warton, Inquiry into the Authenticity of the Rowley Poems, criticism
 William Woty, Poetical WorksOther
 Martin Wieland, Graces, Germany
 Voltaire, Épître à l'Auteur du Livre des Trois Imposteurs ("Letter to the author of The Three Impostors"); France

Births
Death years link to the corresponding "[year] in poetry" article:
 February 1 – Robert Anderson (died 1833), English Cumbrian dialect poet
 March 20 – Friedrich Hölderlin (died 1843), German
 April 7 – William Wordsworth (died 1850), English Poet Laureate
 April 11 – George Canning (died 1827), English prime minister and occasional poet
 December 9 bapt.'' – James Hogg (died 1835), Scottish poet and novelist writing in both Scots and English

Deaths
Birth years link to the corresponding "[year] in poetry" article:
 c. January – William Falconer (born 1732), Scottish poet (lost at sea)
 June 21 – Charlotta Frölich (born 1698), Swedish writer
 June 23 – Mark Akenside (born 1721), British poet and physician
 August 24 – Thomas Chatterton, English poet and forger of medieval poetry (born 1752), suicide by arsenic poisoning rather than death by starvation at age of 17; although his death is little noticed at the time, he is later an icon of unacknowledged genius for the Romantics
 Also:
 Friedrich Carl Casimir von Creuz (born 1724), German
 Alasdair mac Mhaighstir Alasdair (born c.1698), Scottish Gaelic poet
 Kunchan Nambiar (born 1705), Malayalam language poet, performer, satirist

See also

 List of years in poetry
 List of years in literature
 18th century in poetry
 18th century in literature
 French literature of the 18th century
 Sturm und Drang (the conventional translation is "Storm and Stress"; a more literal translation, however, might be "storm and urge", "storm and longing", "storm and drive" or "storm and impulse"), a movement in German literature (including poetry) and music from the late 1760s through the early 1780s
 List of years in poetry
 Poetry

Notes

18th-century poetry
Poetry